The third series of Ex on the Beach Poland, a Polish television programme, began airing on 30 October 2017 on MTV. The show was announced in 12 October 2017. Cast member for this series include Warsaw Shore star Alan Kwieciński and Marta Hrycyk. The series was filmed in Cyprus.

Cast 
The official list of cast members was released on 25 October 2017 and includes four single boys: Warsaw Shore cast member Alan Kwieciński, Denis Ilbeyli, Hubert Korczak and Norbert Hawryluk; as well as four single girls: Alicja Nikola "Nicki Queen" Kolasińska, Joanna Kasprzyk, Marta Hrycyk and Monika "Esmeralda" Godlewska. Ahead of the launch of the new series, it was confirmed that Series 2 cast member Hubert Korczak would be returning for the third series as main cast. Warsaw Shore cast member Damian Zduńczyk was also confirmed to be taking part in the series featuring as an ex.

Bold indicates original cast member; all other cast were brought into the series as an ex.

Duration of cast

Notes 
 Key:  = "Cast member" is featured in this episode.
 Key:  = "Cast member" arrives on the beach.
 Key:  = "Cast member" has an ex arrive on the beach.
 Key:  = "Cast member" leaves the beach.
 Key:  = "Cast member" does not feature in this episode.

Episodes

References 

2017 Polish television seasons
Poland (series 3)